Steven Newsome (1952-2012) was an American arts and museum administrator. Newsome grew up in Norfolk, Virginia. He attended Trinity College, Hartford and Emory University. He is the former Chief of the Office of Cultural and Educational Services in the Division of History and Cultural Program at the Department of Housing and Community Development, in Annapolis, Maryland. He was Executive Director of the Maryland Commission on Afro-American History and Culture and director of the Banneker-Douglass Museum. In 1990  he became the director of the Anacostia Museum, before retiring in 2004. Newsome was the founding director of the Prince George's African American Museum & Cultural Center.

Newsome died  September 27, 2012. He was survived by his daughter, Sanya Newsome, and two granddaughters. A public tribute was held 2 December 2012 at the Arena Stage in Washington, D.C.

References

1952 births
2012 deaths
Emory University alumni
People from Norfolk, Virginia
Smithsonian Institution people
Trinity College (Connecticut) alumni
Directors of museums in the United States
African-American museum directors
21st-century African-American people
20th-century African-American people